Jalmari Johannes ("Lauri") Eskola (16 November 1886 in Pöytyä – 7 January 1958) was a Finnish male athlete who competed mainly in the Cross Country Team.

He competed for Finland in the 1912 Summer Olympics held in Stockholm, Sweden in the Cross Country Team where he won the silver medal with his teammates Hannes Kolehmainen and Albin Stenroos.

References

External links 
 Sports Reference

1886 births
1958 deaths
People from Pöytyä
Finnish male long-distance runners
Olympic silver medalists for Finland
Athletes (track and field) at the 1912 Summer Olympics
Olympic athletes of Finland
Medalists at the 1912 Summer Olympics
Olympic silver medalists in athletics (track and field)
Finnish male cross country runners
Olympic cross country runners
Sportspeople from Southwest Finland
19th-century Finnish people
20th-century Finnish people